Face to Face is the second studio album by Trevor Rabin released in 1979. Rabin composed the songs except for two written by his manager, Pete Smith.

Track listing
All tracks composed and arranged by Trevor Rabin; except where indicated

Personnel
  Trevor Rabin - vocals, guitar, bass, keyboards, backing vocals
  Kevin Kruger - drums
  Dave Mattacks - drums
  Rene Arnell - backing vocals
Technical
 Jon Kelly, Jon Walls - engineers
 Geoff Emerick, Hennie Hartmann - recording

References 

1979 albums
Trevor Rabin albums
Albums produced by Trevor Rabin
Chrysalis Records albums